Cormac Izuchukwu (born 28 January 2000) is an Irish rugby union player who plays lock for Ulster in the United Rugby Championship. 

He was born in London to an Irish mother and Nigerian father. He moved to Offaly when he was 7 where he and his brother and sister were raised by their mother. He started playing rugby with Tullamore RFC in Offaly, before going to Roscrea College, where he played for the first XV in the Leinster Schools Cup quarter-finals. He was offered an opportunity to try out for Connacht at under-19 level, but twisted his ankle and was unable to attend. He signed up for a coaching course in Kelso, Scotland, which included training with Newcastle Falcons. The resulting highlights video came to the attention of Anthony Eddy at the IRFU, who signed him up for Ireland Sevens. He represented Ireland at two sevens competitions in 2019.

He joined the Ulster academy ahead of the 2020–21 season, and made his Ulster debut coming in the 63rd minute of 21―7 victory over Ospreys on 26 February 2021. He played in the subsequent games against Glasgow Warriors and Leinster when he received a yellow card. He signed a two-year contract with the province in April 2021. He was selected for the Emerging Ireland squad for the Toyota Challenge in South Africa in September 2022.

References

External links
Ulster Rugby profile
United Rugby Championship profile

itsrugby.co.uk Profile

2000 births
Living people
Irish rugby union players
Ulster Rugby players
Rugby union locks
Rugby union flankers
Ireland international rugby sevens players
English emigrants to Ireland
Irish people of Nigerian descent
Black Irish sportspeople
Rugby union players from County Offaly
21st-century Irish people